= Travel safe officer =

UK transport company employees

Travel Safe Officers (TSOs) are security staff accredited by the British Transport Police. They are funded and employed by the train operating companies to provide a high-visibility presence on the railway, reducing antisocial behaviour and reassuring passengers.

The Railway Safety Accreditation Scheme enables officers to exercise limited powers under the Railway Bylaws, section 219 of the Transport Act 2000.
